Nicolas Charles Seringe (3 December 1776 – 29 December 1858) was a French physician and botanist born in Longjumeau.

He studied medicine in Paris, and subsequently served as a military surgeon. In this role, he was involved in the German campaign under General Jean Victor Marie Moreau (1763-1813). Afterwards, he left the army and relocated to Bern, where he developed an interest in botany. From 1801 to 1820, he taught classes in Bern. One of his students was Ludwig Schaerer, who later became a pastor and lichenologist. Seringe followed with teaching similar duties in Geneva (1820–1830). In 1830 he was named the director of the Jardin de Plantes de Lyon, and from 1834 he taught classes at the University of Lyon.

Seringe belonged to several learned societies, including the Linnean Society of Lyon, of which he was a founding member. Among his written efforts were an 1815 monograph on willows native to Switzerland, a treatise on Swiss cereal grains titled "Monographie des céréales de la Suisse" (1818) and a work on cereal grains of Europe called "Descriptions et figures des céréales européennes" (1841).

The genus Seringia is named in his honor.

See also
 :Category:Taxa named by Nicolas Charles Seringe

References 
 Societies Savantes de France (translated biography and bibliography)

1776 births
1858 deaths
Academic staff of the University of Lyon
19th-century French botanists
19th-century French physicians
18th-century French physicians